Coşerniţa may refer to several places in Moldova:

Coşerniţa, a commune in Criuleni district
Coşerniţa, a commune in Floreşti district